"Crazy Story (Remix)" or "Crazy Story 2.0" is a song by American rapper King Von featuring American rapper Lil Durk.
It was released on May 3, 2019, as a single extracted from Von's first mixtape Grandson, Vol. 1.
It is the continuation of "Crazy Story" and the prelude to "Crazy Story, Pt. 3". The song uses the same instrumental of the first piece, that was produced by Mac Fly.

Composition 
The verse from Von is the same as the original song, however, there is the addition of Durk's verse that uses a flow that takes Von's cadence and metrics, but adapting them to his style. Basically Durk continues the first story telling with the aftermath of the events and depicting a scenario of revenge for the previous ambush by the opps

Music video 
The music video was released on May 20, 2019. It shows Von and Durk in the neighborhood with other OTF members, including Booka600, Memo600, DoodieLo, with interspersed scenes of shootings describing the lyrics of the song

Charts

Certifications

References 

2020 singles
2020 songs
Empire Distribution singles
King Von songs